The Diocese of Dunedin is one of the thirteen dioceses and hui amorangi (Māori bishoprics) of the Anglican Church in Aotearoa, New Zealand and Polynesia. The diocese covers the same area as the provinces of Otago and Southland in the South Island of New Zealand. Area 65,990 km2, population 272,541 (2001). Anglicans are traditionally the third largest religious group in Otago and Southland after Presbyterians and Roman Catholics.

Description of arms: Gules between a cross saltire argent, four starts argent on the fess point a Bible.

In 1814 the Gospel first preached in Aotearoa at Oihi, Northland by Anglican missionary Samuel Marsden, in 1841George Selwyn consecrated and appointed Bishop of New Zealand (including Polynesia and Melanesia). In 1843 the first Anglican missionaries to come to Southland and Otago were Tamihana Te Rauparaha and Matene Te Whiwhi. In 1852 Rev. John Fenton arrives in Dunedin; he was the first Anglican priest to settle south of Lyttleton. In 1856 when the Diocese of New Zealand was subdivided, Southland and Otago were included in the Diocese of Christchurch. In 1866 Henry Lascelles Jenner selected and ordained by the Archbishop of Canterbury “into the office of a Bishop of the United Church of England and Ireland in the colony of New Zealand”, with the intention that he be Bishop of Dunedin. In 1869 the Diocese of Dunedin formed from the Diocese of Christchurch. The first meeting of Dunedin's synod rejected Jenner's claim to the See
1871	Samuel Nevill enthroned as 1st bishop of Dunedin.

The Bishop of Dunedin's cathedra is at St. Paul's Cathedral, Dunedin.

The diocese has a total of 33 parishes. The adaption of "Local Shared Ministry" has been a strategy by which local people are ordained to serve in a parish which cannot afford to support full-time professional clergy.

The diocese includes Anglo-Catholic, broad and Evangelical parishes.

History

In 1990, the diocese made history by electing Penny Jamieson as their seventh bishop. Jamieson was the first woman to become a diocesan bishop in the Anglican Communion and only the second woman consecrated bishop, the first being Bishop Barbara Harris. The eighth bishop was the Right Revd George Connor, who became Bishop of Dunedin in 2005. The diocese gained some publicity in 2006 when (with the support of the Diocesan Standing Committee), Connor ordained an openly gay man to the diaconate. A moratorium on ordinations in the diocese was declared until the New Zealand church achieved a common mind on the full inclusion of homosexual persons at every level of ministry in the church. Connor retired in November 2009. The ninth Bishop of Dunedin, Kelvin Wright, was installed in February 2010 and retired in April 2017. He was succeeded by Steven Benford previously Vicar of The Church of St. Joseph the Worker in North London, who was consecrated and installed in September 2017.

The Diocese has declined drastically in numbers in the 21st Century, leading to the closing and selling of many Churches, including the historic church in Clyde, which was sold against the wishes of the local community, and the largest church in Invercargill, among many others.

List of bishops

Deans

Archdeaconries
In 1886, there were three archdeaconries: Edward Edwards was Archdeacon of Dunedin, George Beaumont of Invercargill and Queenstown and John Fenton of Oamaru; within a year, Harry Stocker had also become an archdeacon.

Social service organisations

 The South Centre, Invercargill.
 Anglican Family Care Centre, Dunedin.

School

 St Hilda's Collegiate School, Dunedin

University hall of residence

 Selwyn College founded in 1893 is the oldest college for students at the University of Otago.  There was a long debate within the Church about whether to sell the college, which was the subject of consultations, hui, and a special Synod.  A decision to retain the college was made in 2020.

Homes for the aged

 St Barnabas Home, Dunedin
 Parata Home, Gore
 North Otago Anglican Homes for the Aged, Oamaru

Orphanage

In the past the diocese operated St Mary's Orphanage, Dunedin.

Religious orders

 The Community of Sisters of the Church was active in the diocese from the end of the 19th century until the 1930s. They were invited by Bishop Nevill to found a school for girls. They founded St Hilda's Collegiate School.

Companion dioceses

 Edinburgh
 Eastern Zambia

References

Further reading

External links
 Diocese of Dunedin
 Anglican Church in Aotearoa New Zealand and Polynesia
 Anglican Communion
 St Paul's Cathedral Dunedin

Religious organizations established in 1869
Dunedin
Anglican dioceses established in the 19th century
 
Christianity in Dunedin
1869 establishments in New Zealand